The 1999–2000 EHF Women's Champions League was the eighth edition of the modern era of the EHF's premier competition for women's handball clubs, running from 7 October 2000 to 23 May 2001. Krim Ljubljana defeated Viborg HK in the final to become the first Slovenian team to win the competition, with Budućnost Podgorica and Ferencvárosi TC also reaching the semifinals. Defending champion Hypo Niederösterreich didn't make it past the que group stage.

1st qualifying round

2nd qualifying round

Group stage

Group A

Group B

Group C

Group D

Quarter-finals

Semi-finals

Final

References

Women's EHF Champions League
Ehf Women's Champions League, 2000-01
Ehf Women's Champions League, 2000-01
EHF
EHF